Uti possidetis juris or uti possidetis iuris (Latin for "as [you] possess under law") is a principle of international law which provides that newly-formed sovereign states should retain the internal borders that their preceding dependent area had before their independence.

History
Uti possidetis juris is a modified form of uti possidetis; created for the purpose of avoiding terra nullius, the original version of uti possidetis began as a Roman law governing the rightful possession of property. During the medieval period it evolved into a law governing international relations and has recently been modified for situations related to newly independent states.

Application
Uti possidetis juris has been applied in modern history to such regions as South America, Africa, the Middle East, and the Soviet Union, and numerous other regions where centralized governments were broken up, where imperial rulers were overthrown, or where League of Nations mandates ended, e.g. Palestine and Nauru. It is often applied to prevent foreign intervention by eliminating any contested terra nullius, or no man's land, that foreign powers could claim, or to prevent disputes that could emerge with the possibility of redrawing the borders of new states after their independence.

The principle was also applied by the Badinter Arbitration Committee in opinions related to the disintegration of Yugoslavia, specifically no. 2, on self-determination, and no. 3, on the nature of the boundaries between Croatia and Serbia and between Bosnia and Herzegovina and Serbia.

Argentina and Chile base their territorial claims in Antarctica on the uti possidetis juris principle in the same manner as their now recognized Patagonian claims.

See also
Uti possidetis

References

Shaw, Malcolm N. (1997). "Peoples, Territorialism and Boundaries." European Journal of International Law 8 (3).
Hensel, Paul R.; Michael E. Allison and Ahmed Khanani (2006). "Territorial Integrity Treaties, Uti Possidetis, and Armed Conflict over Territory." Presented at the Shambaugh Conference "Building Synergies: Institutions and Cooperation in World Politics," University of Iowa, 13 October 2006.

Legal rules with Latin names
 
Borders

es:Uti possidetis iure
fr:Uti possidetis juris